Sir Douglas Lorimer Kidd  (born 12 September 1941) is a former New Zealand politician. He was an MP from 1978 to 2002, representing the National Party. He served for three years as Speaker of the House of Representatives.

Early life

Kidd was born in Levin. From 1960 to 1964, he served in the New Zealand Army Territorial Force as a bombardier gunlayer. He later obtained a LLB from Victoria University of Wellington, and worked as a lawyer. He also had business interests in aquaculture, forestry, and wine making.

Member of Parliament

In the government of Jim Bolger, Kidd held a number of minor ministerial portfolios, including Fisheries, Energy and Labour. He held his Marlborough electorate until the 1996 election, when the electorate was abolished and most of its area incorporated into the new and larger  electorate. Kidd came first in Kaikoura in 1996. In the following election he sought election as a list MP only. He was succeeded in Kaikoura by Lynda Scott and retired from Parliament at the 2002 election.

Status of the Unborn Child Bill
In 1983 Kidd's anti-abortion Status of the Unborn Child Bill (a private members bill) was drawn from the lot. The bill was prompted by Wall v Livingston [1982], which clarified that embryos and fetuses had no legal status in New Zealand and that third parties could not appeal to the courts on their behalf. The bill was supported by groups  such as  Society for the Protection of the Unborn Child (now Voice for Life and Right to Life New Zealand) but defeated by pro-choice groups led by Marilyn Waring.

Speaker of the House
After the 1996 election, Kidd was elected Speaker of the House of Representatives; Derek Quigley also contested the position. He replaced Peter Tapsell, a Labour Party MP who had held the speakership because National, which had won the election by a single seat, did not want to lose a vote by appointing a Speaker from its own ranks. Kidd lost the speakership when the National Party lost the 1999 election, being replaced by Jonathan Hunt of the Labour Party. After serving a term in Opposition, he chose to retire from politics at the 2002 election.

After Parliament
In the 2000 Queen's Birthday Honours, Kidd was appointed a Distinguished Companion of the New Zealand Order of Merit, for services as Speaker of the House of Representatives between 1996 and 1999, and he accepted redesignation as a Knight Companion of the New Zealand Order of Merit in August 2009 following the restoration of titular honours by the New Zealand government.

Kidd was appointed to the Waitangi Tribunal in 2004.

References

1941 births
Knights Companion of the New Zealand Order of Merit
Living people
Members of the Cabinet of New Zealand
20th-century New Zealand lawyers
New Zealand National Party MPs
Speakers of the New Zealand House of Representatives
Members of the New Zealand House of Representatives
Victoria University of Wellington alumni
People from Levin, New Zealand
People from the Marlborough Region
New Zealand list MPs
21st-century New Zealand politicians
Members of the Waitangi Tribunal
New Zealand politicians awarded knighthoods